Speyer (older spelling Speier, French: Spire, historical English: Spires) is a city in Rhineland-Palatinate in Germany with approximately 50,000 inhabitants. Founded by the Romans, it is one of Germany's oldest cities. Speyer Cathedral, a number of other churches, and the Altpörtel (old gate) dominate the Speyer landscape. In the cathedral, beneath the high altar, are the tombs of eight Holy Roman Emperors and German kings.

The city is famous for the 1529 Protestation at Speyer. One of the ShUM-cities which formed the cultural center of Jewish life in Europe during the Middle Ages, Speyer and its Jewish courtyard was inscribed on the UNESCO World Heritage List in 2021.

History

The first known names were Noviomagus and Civitas Nemetum, after the Teutonic tribe, Nemetes, settled in the area. The name Spira is first recorded in the 7th century, taken from villa Spira, a Frankish settlement situated outside of Civitas Nemetum.

Timeline
 In 10 BC, the first Roman military camp is established (situated between the town hall and the episcopal palace).
 In AD 150, the town appears as Noviomagus on the world map of the Greek geographer Ptolemy.
 In 346, a bishop for the town is mentioned for the first time.
 4th century, Civitas Nemetum appears on the Peutinger Map.
 5th century, Civitas Nemetum is destroyed.
 7th century, the town is re-established, and named Spira after a nearby Frankish settlement.
 In 1030, emperor Conrad II starts the construction of Speyer Cathedral, today one of the UNESCO World Heritage Sites. Also in the 11th century, the first city wall is built.
 In 1076, emperor Henry IV embarks from Speyer, his favourite town, for Canossa.
 In 1084, establishment of the first Jewish community in Speyer.
 In 1096, as Count Emicho's Crusader army rages across the Rhineland slaughtering Jewish communities, Speyer's Bishop John, with the local leader Yekutiel ben Moses, manages to secure the community's members inside the episcopal palace and later leads them to even stronger fortifications outside the town. It was ruled that anyone harming a Jew would have his hands chopped off.
 In 1294, the bishop loses most of his previous rights, and from now on Speyer is a Free Imperial Town of the Holy Roman Empire.
 In 1349, the Jewish community of Speyer is wiped out.
 Between 1527 and 1689, Speyer is the seat of the Imperial Chamber Court.
 In 1526, at the Diet of Speyer (1526) interim toleration of Lutheran teaching and worship is decreed.
 In 1529, at the Diet of Speyer (1529) the Lutheran states of the empire protest against the anti-Reformation resolutions (19 April 1529 Protestation at Speyer, hence the term Protestantism).
 In 1635, Marshal of France Urbain de Maillé-Brézé, together with Jacques Nompar de Caumont, duc de La Force, conquers Heidelberg and Speyer at the head of the Army of Germany.
 In 1689, the town is heavily damaged by French troops.
 Between 1792 and 1814, Speyer is under French jurisdiction after the Battle of Speyer.
 In 1816, Speyer becomes the seat of administration of the Palatinate and of the government of the Rhine District of Bavaria (later called the Bavarian Palatinate), and remains so until the end of World War II.
 In 1861, Albert Edward was introduced to Alexandra by Crown Princess Victoria.
 Between 1883 and 1904, the Memorial Church is built in remembrance of the Protestation of 1529.
 In 1947, the State Academy of Administrative Science is founded (later renamed German University of Administrative Sciences Speyer).
 In 1990, Speyer celebrates its 2000th anniversary.

Main sights

 Cathedral
 Altpörtel – Old Town Gate
 Gedächtniskirche – Memorial church
 Dreifaltigkeitskirche – Trinity church
 Jewish courtyard (Judenhof Speyer) – remnants of medieval synagogue and intact mikve, UNESCO World Heritage Site
 Technikmuseum Speyer – Transportation Museum
 Historical Museum of the Palatinate

Transportation 

Speyer lies on the Schifferstadt-Wörth railway and offers hourly connections to Mannheim and Karlsruhe.

Mayors
Since 1923 the mayor was a Lord Mayor.

Twin towns – sister cities

Speyer is twinned with:

 Spalding, United Kingdom, since 1956
 Chartres, France, since 1959
 Kursk, Russia, since 1989
 Ravenna, Italy, since 1989
 Gniezno, Poland, since 1992
 Yavne, Israel, since 1998
 Rusizi District, Rwanda, since 1982/2001
 Ningde, China, since 2013

Notable people

Born before 1900

 Samuel of Speyer (after 1096–death unknown), Exeget of Torah and Midrash
 Judah ben Samuel of Regensburg (1140–1217), scribe and philosopher
 Julian of Speyer (before 1225– ~ 1250), medieval choir master, composer and poet from the Order of the Franciscans
 Gabriel Biel (~ 1415–1495), scholastic philosopher
 Dietrich Gresemund (1477–1512), author
 Georg von Speyer (1500–1540), conquistador
 Egon VIII of Fürstenberg-Heiligenberg (1588–1635), Reichsgraf of Fürstenberg-Heiligenberg
 Johann Joachim Becher (1635–1682), German physician, alchemist, precursor of chemistry, scholar and adventurer
 Moritz Georg Weidmann (1658–1693), publisher and bookseller
 Adolf von Dalberg (1678–1737), Prince of Fulda
 Simha of Speyer (13th century) German rabbi and tosafist. He was one of the leading signatories of the Takkanot Shum.
 Philipp Hieronymus Brinckmann (1709–1760), landscape and historical painters as well as copper cutters
 Johann Martin Bernatz (1802–1878), landscape painter
 Anselm Feuerbach (1829–1880), German painter
 Carl Jakob Adolf Christian Gerhardt (1832–1902), German physician
 Henry Villard (1835–1900), German-American journalist
 Hermann von Stengel (1837–1919), Bavarian Administrative Officer
 Wilhelm Meyer (philologist) (1845–1917), classical philologist, mediavist and librarian
 Karl Heinrich Emil Becker (1879–1940), general of the artillery, ballist and defense scientist
 Hans Purrmann (1880–1966), painter, graphic artist, art writer and collector
 Hermann Detzner (1882–1970), leader of the German Schutztruppe in German New Guinea
 Karl-Adolf Hollidt (1891–1985), Army officer (Generaloberst) and war criminal
 George Waldbott (1898–1982), German-American physician

Born after 1900
 George John Dasch (1903–1992), WWII spy who foiled terrorist attacks in the U.S. by Nazi Germany 
Jakob Brendel (1907–1964), wrestler
 Karl Haas (1913–2005), German-American music educator and radio presenter
 Helmut Bantz (1921–2004), gymnast
 Alfred Cahn (1922–2016), German musician and composer
 Edgar E. Stern (born 1926), clinical social worker and author of The Peppermint Train: Journey to a German-Jewish Childhood
 Gabriel Kney (born 1929), Canadian organ builder
 Karl Hochreither (1933–2018), German organist and musicologist
 Volker Straus (1936–2002) German tonmeister
 Jürgen Brecht (born 1940), fencer
 Wolf Frobenius (1940–2011), musicologist
 Gerhard Vollmer (born 1943), physicist and philosopher
 Jürgen Creutzmann (born 1945), politician (FDP)
 Hans-Joachim Lang (born 1951), journalist, Germanist, historian and honorary professor
 Axel Schimpf (born 1952), Vice Admiral of the German Navy
 Eberhard Bosslet (born 1953), artist
 Kay Friedmann (born 1963), footballer
 Markus Kranz (born 1969), football player
 Christoph Bechmann (born 1971), German field-hockey player
 Anke Vondung (born 1972), opera singer
 Ralf Schmitt (born 1977), football player
 Simone Weiler (born 1978), swimmer
 Jochen Kühner (born 1980), rower
 Martin Kühner (born 1980), rower
 Matthias Langkamp (born 1984), football player
 Christian Reif (born 1984), long jumper
 David McCray (born 1986), basketball player
 Florian Krebs (born 1988), football player
 Sebastian Langkamp (born 1988), footballer
 Lars Stindl (born 1988), German footballer
 Elias Harris (born 1989), German international basketball player
 Jonas Marz (born 1989), footballer
 Gianluca Korte (born 1990), footballer
 Raffael Korte (born 1990), footballer

See also
 Technikmuseum Speyer
 German University of Administrative Sciences Speyer
 Speyer line
 History of the Jews in Speyer
 Shapiro

Notes

Further reading

External links

 speyer.de the town website (partly in English)
 museum.speyer.de Historical Museum of the Palatinate 
 dom-speyer.de website of Speyer Cathedral 
 Explore the ShUM Sites of Speyer, Worms and Mainz in the UNESCO collection on Google Arts and Culture
 Model Map of Medieval Speyer
  Speyer, its cathedral and the library of its chapter
 Technical (Transport) Museum
 www.speyer.de: living history in past times
 www.speyer-tour.de: Guided tours through Speyer
 City overview and photos

 
1792 disestablishments
History of the Palatinate (region)
States and territories established in 1294
Palatinate (region)